João Crevelim (14 June 1944 – 1 November 2013), better known as Liminha, was a Brazilian footballer and manager who played as a defensive midfielder. With 513 appearances, Liminha is one of the most capped players in Flamengo history.

Career 
Liminha arrived at Flamengo in 1968 as part of the negotiation involving the fullback Cardoso. He played alongside club idol Carlinhos.

Liminha played 513 matches for Flamengo (250 wins, 145 draws, 118 losses). He scored 29 goals, his first being against Guarani in his second match for the club. Liminha has the eighth most appearances by a player in Flamengo history.

In 2005, Liminha briefly took over the manager position of Flamengo's youth teams. He managed seven matches (4 wins, 2 draws, 1 loss).

Death 
Liminha died on 1 November 2013 in the ICU of the TotalCor Hospital in Ipanema, Rio de Janeiro as a result of a dental problem that evolved into a generalized infection.

Titles 

 Flamengo

 Taça Guanabara: 1970, 1972, 1973
 Campeonato Carioca: 1972, 1974

See also 

 List of Clube de Regatas do Flamengo players

References 

1944 births
2013 deaths
Footballers from Rio de Janeiro (city)
Brazilian footballers
Association football midfielders
CR Flamengo footballers
Campeonato Brasileiro Série A players